I defended a woman (Hungarian: Megvédtem egy asszonyt) is a 1938 Hungarian comedy film directed by Ákos Ráthonyi and starring Antal Páger, Mária Lázár and Andor Ajtay. A lawyer acts for a woman in a case, but soon finds himself embroiled in her divorce as a co-respondent.

Cast
 Antal Páger ... Bory Péter, engineer
 Mária Lázár ... Mrs Bakos, Maca, wife
 Béla Mihályffi ... Mr Bakos Kázmér, husband
 Ági Donáth ... Zita, Horváth'a daughter
 Lajos Boray ... Dr.Veress István, lawyer
 Andor Ajtay ... Horváth Dezsõ, hussar officer 
 Mariska Vízváry ... Mrs Bory
 László Z. Molnár ... duel assistant 
 Márta Fónay ... waitress
 Hilda Gobbi ... witness at jury

External links

1938 films
1938 comedy films
1930s Hungarian-language films
Films directed by Ákos Ráthonyi
Hungarian black-and-white films
Hungarian comedy films